Mohamed Ibrahim Ramadan (born 7 March 1984) is an Egyptian handball player, playing for Al Ahly and the Egyptian national team.

He competed at the 2008 Summer Olympics, where the Egyptian team placed 10th, and at the 2016 Summer Olympics, where they placed 9th.

Honours

National Team
African Championship
 Winner (2): 2008 Angola , 2016 Egypt
 Runners-up: 2010 Egypt, 2018 Gabon

Mediterranean Games
 Gold Medalist: Handball at the 2013 Mediterranean Games

Club

Al Ahly

Egyptian Handball League
 Winner: (7) : 2005–06, 2007–08, 2011–12, 2012–13, 2013–14, 2016–17, 2017-18 . 
Egypt Handball Cup
 Winner: (2) : 2008–09, 2013-14 .

IHF Super Globe
 Runners-up: 2007 IHF Super Globe

African Super Cup
 Winner: (1) 2017 Aghadir

African Champions League
 Winner:(2) 2012 Tangier, Ouagadougou 2016

African Cup Winners' Cup
 Winner: (3) 2013 Hamammat , 2017 Aghadir , 2018 Cairo

Arab Championship of Champions
 Winner :(1) 2010 Cairo

Arab Handball Championship of Winners' Cup
 Winner :(1) 2011 Makkah

References

External links
 
 

1984 births
Living people
Egyptian male handball players
Olympic handball players of Egypt
Handball players at the 2008 Summer Olympics
Handball players at the 2016 Summer Olympics
Mediterranean Games gold medalists for Egypt
Mediterranean Games medalists in handball
Competitors at the 2013 Mediterranean Games
21st-century Egyptian people